Gurunsi or Grusi may refer to:
 Gurunsi people, a people of northern Ghana and south and central Burkina Faso
 Gurunsi languages, languages spoken them, in the Gur branch of the Niger-Congo family